The following is a list of Major League Baseball players, retired or active.

Ka through Ki

References

External links
List of Major League Baseball players at Baseball-Reference

 Ka-Ki